William Brown (27 March 1928 – May 2010) was an English footballer who played as a wing half.

Brown started his career with non-league Murton Colliery Welfare before signing for Gateshead in September 1950. He scored a total of 7 goals in 238 appearances in the league and FA Cup for Gateshead. Brown moved to Berwick Rangers before playing for non-league Blyth Spartans.

References

External links
 

1928 births
2010 deaths

English footballers

Association football wing halves
Gateshead A.F.C. players
Berwick Rangers F.C. players
Blyth Spartans A.F.C. players
English Football League players
Murton A.F.C. players
Scottish Football League players
Sportspeople from Seaham
Footballers from County Durham